Oscar Lee Longoria Jr. (born October 2, 1981) is an American attorney and Democratic member of the Texas House of Representatives, representing the 35th District. He was first elected to the Texas legislature in 2013.

Early life and education
Longoria was born in Mission and raised in South Texas. He attended the La Joya Independent School District. Longoria attended South Texas College for two years before transferring to the University of Texas at Austin, where he graduated in 2003 with a Bachelor of Science in Communication Studies. In 2007, Longoria graduated with his Doctorate of Jurisprudence from the University of Texas School of Law. Longoria was elected to the newly redistricted 35th District of Texas in 2013. In 2017 Longoria announced that he will seek his fourth term in the Texas House of Representatives.

Longoria was appointed Vice-Chairman of the House Appropriations Committee for the 85th Legislature, he continues serving on the Investments & Financial Services Committee, and was newly appointed to the Local & Consent Calendars Committee. During the 2016 interim, Longoria was appointed to serve on the Joint Interim Committee to Study Border Security.

Legal career
Longoria owns and operates the Law Office of Oscar Longoria. He is licensed to practice law in Texas, including in the United States District Court for the Southern District of Texas. Longoria is a member of the Hidalgo County Bar Association, and the Hidalgo County Young Lawyers Association.

Longoria has previously served on the Agua Special Utility District as a board member and is also a former member of the board of trustees for South Texas College.

Personal life
Longoria is married to Jennifer Ruiz-Longoria of Mission. In 2018, Longoria was awarded the University of Texas at Austin’s Outstanding Texas Ex Award due to Longoria's work representing Hidalgo and Cameron County.

References

External links
 
 
Legislative page
 Oscar Longoria at the Texas Tribune

Living people
Democratic Party members of the Texas House of Representatives
21st-century American politicians
People from Mission, Texas
University of Texas at Austin alumni
University of Texas School of Law alumni
1981 births